Microdaphne is a genus of sea snails, marine gastropod mollusks in the family Raphitomidae.

Species
Species within the genus Microdaphne include:
 † Microdaphne indohystrix Harzhauser, 2014 
 Microdaphne morrisoni Rehder, 1980
 Microdaphne trichodes (Dall, 1919)

References

External links
 McLean, J.H. (1971) A revised classification of the family Turridae, with the proposal of new subfamilies, genera, and subgenera from the Eastern Pacific. The Veliger, 14, 114–130
 Bouchet, P.; Kantor, Y. I.; Sysoev, A.; Puillandre, N. (2011). A new operational classification of the Conoidea (Gastropoda). Journal of Molluscan Studies. 77(3): 273-308
 
 Worldwide Mollusc Species Data Base: Raphitomidae

 
Raphitomidae
Gastropod genera